Skelton Glacier is a large glacier flowing from the polar plateau into the Ross Ice Shelf at Skelton Inlet on the Hillary Coast, south of Victoria Land, Antarctica.

Discovery and naming

Named after the Skelton Inlet by the New Zealand party of the CTAE, 1956–58. The glacier was chosen in 1957 as the New Zealand party's route from the Ross Ice Shelf to the polar plateau in support of the main expedition led by Vivian Fuchs to make the first overland crossing of the continent. Allison Glacier descends from the west slopes of Royal Society Range into Skelton Glacier.
It was also the route of the four month  Victoria Land Traverse 1959-1960 which ascended the Skelton Glacier from the Ross Ice Shelf to make the first entry into the deep interior of Victoria Land from the head of the Skelton Glacier to the French Adelie Land Traverse of 1958-1959 near Dumont d'Urville Station on George V Coast, and thence to the Transantarctic Mountains in the vicinity of the USARP Mountains.

See also
 List of glaciers in the Antarctic
 Norton Crag, rock summit near the center of the upper Skelton Glacier

References

Further reading
1. Antarctica, by A.S.Helm and J.H.Miller. The story of the New Zealand Party of the Trans-Antarctic Expedition. 1964. R.E.Owen, Government Printer, Wellington, New Zealand.
2. "New Zealand and the Antarctic" by L.B.Quatermain. 1971. A. R. Shearer, Government Printer, Wellington, New Zealand.

Glaciers of Hillary Coast